Georges Donnet (born 4 December 1888, date of death unknown) was a French gymnast. He competed in the men's team event at the 1908 Summer Olympics.

References

External links
 

1888 births
Year of death missing
French male artistic gymnasts
Olympic gymnasts of France
Gymnasts at the 1908 Summer Olympics
Place of birth missing